Trechus kaikanicus is a species of ground beetle in the subfamily Trechinae. It was described by Belousov & Kabak in 1994.

Distribution
Trechus kaikanicus is thought to be endemic to a small and isolated ridge situated in the north of the Dzhungarian mountain range.

References

kaikanicus
Beetles described in 1994